The 2016–17 Ukrainian First League was the 26th since its establishment.  The fixtures were announced on 16 July 2016, and the competition commenced on 24 July 2016. The spring session started on 12 March 2017 with the competition ending on 2 June 2017.

Teams

Promoted teams
Originally, as per competition regulations the top three teams were promoted from the 2015–16 Ukrainian Second League. However, prior to the season commencing at the Conference of the PFL in preparation for the season the committee decided to expand the competition to eighteen teams and include the fourth, fifth and sixth placed teams. Six teams promotion beat the previous record of five teams that was set back in 2002 (14 years ago).

 Kolos Kovalivka – champion of the 2015–16 Ukrainian Second League (debut)
 Veres Rivne – runner-up (returning for the first time since 1996–97 season, 19 seasons absence)
 Inhulets Petrove – 3rd placed (debut)
 Bukovyna Chernivtsi – 4th placed (returning after one season)
 Skala Stryi – 5th placed (debut, however a club from Stryi namely FC Hazovyk-Skala Stryi competed in the 2005–06 season)
 Arsenal Kyiv – 6th placed (debut, however a predecessor of Arsenal Kyiv, CSKA-Borysfen Kyiv, competed in the 1994–95 season)

Relegated teams 

No teams were relegated from the Ukrainian Premier League

Withdrawn teams 
Two teams were withdrawn before the season:
 Dynamo-2 Kyiv
 Hirnyk Kryvyi Rih

Location map 
The following displays the location of teams.

Stadiums 

The following stadiums are considered home grounds for the teams in the competition.

Managers

Managerial changes

League table

Results

Position by round

Relegation play-off

The draw for relegation play-off scheduling was held on 3 June 2017.

First leg

Second leg

PFC Sumy wins 3–1 on aggregate and remains in First League. FC Balkany Zorya loses but later was promoted to the 2017–18 Ukrainian First League, due to sanctions against FC Dnipro.

Top goalscorers
The season top goalscorers were:

Awards

Round awards

Season awards
The laureates of the 2016–17 season were:
 Best player:  Ruslan Stepanyuk (Veres Rivne)
 Best coach:  Oleksandr Ryabokon (Desna Chernihiv)
 Best goalscorer:  Ruslan Stepanyuk (Veres Rivne)

See also
 2016–17 Ukrainian Premier League
 2016–17 Ukrainian Second League
 2016–17 Ukrainian Cup

References

Ukrainian First League seasons
2016–17 in Ukrainian association football leagues
Ukraine